Pock, or Pöck, is a surname commonly associated with Austrian heritage.  The surname is somewhat uncommon in the United States. It may refer to:

 Bernhard Pock (1963-1996), stunt actor
 Pontoffel Pock, fictional character in a Dr. Seuss film
 Thomas Pöck (born 1981), Austrian-American ice hockey player
 Tobias Pock (1609-1683), Austrian Baroque painter 
 Friedrich von Pöck (1825-1884), Austrian admiral and commander of the Austro-Hungarian Navy (1871-1883)

See also
 POC (disambiguation)
 Beauty and Pock Face, a Chinese fairy tale

References

 https://pockley.org/ Pockley family name derived from Pock + ley or forest clearing